The Cape May County Herald is the flagship of the Herald family of community weekly newspapers and publications.

Its offices are in Rio Grande census-designated place in Middle Township, New Jersey.

It has been serving residents and visitors of Cape May County, New Jersey, United States, since 1968.  The newspaper offers in-depth local coverage of news and events in print and online.  The newspaper's online edition provides a comprehensive guide and directory of Cape May and local classified advertising.

The Herald is also the creator of the Digital Press Consortium, a technology consortium of community newspapers that creates software and tools for the community newspaper industry.

Editor Joseph Zelnik died on March 3, 2008, aged 75. 

Editor Alfred S. Campbell retired in September 2019, and the current editor is Erin Ledwon.

References

External links
Herald Newspapers - Cape May County Herald Newspaper
The Cape May County Herald's Facebook Page
The Cape May County Herald's Twitter Page

Middle Township, New Jersey
Cape May County, New Jersey
Newspapers published in New Jersey
Publications established in 1968